Athuman Rashid Mfutakamba (born 19 April 1952) is a Tanzanian CCM politician and Member of Parliament for Igalula constituency since 2010.

References

1952 births
Living people
Chama Cha Mapinduzi MPs
Tanzanian MPs 2010–2015
Kazima Secondary School alumni
Azania Secondary School alumni
University of Dar es Salaam alumni
Stanford University alumni
University of Ottawa alumni